Paul Kandel (born February 15, 1951) is an American musical theatre actor and tenor singer best known for his film role in Disney's The Hunchback of Notre Dame (1996) as the voice of the Roma leader Clopin Trouillefou. He also has appeared on Broadway a number of times, having appeared in Jesus Christ Superstar as King Herod, Titanic, The Who's Tommy, and The Visit. Kandel received a nomination for the 1993 Tony Award for Best Performance by a Featured Actor in a Musical for his portrayal of Uncle Ernie in The Who's Tommy.

Filmography

External links 
 
 

Living people
American male film actors
American male musical theatre actors
American male stage actors
American male television actors
American male voice actors
American operatic tenors
1951 births
20th-century American male actors
20th-century American male singers
20th-century American singers
21st-century American male actors
21st-century American male singers
21st-century American singers